Akademija is a town in Kaunas district municipality, Kaunas County, central Lithuania. According to the 2011 census, the town has a population of 2,807 people. The town began to grow in 1964, when Lithuanian University of Agriculture was transferred to nearby Noreikiškės village. The town was created in 1999 of portions of Noreikiškės and Ringaudai settlements.

References

Towns in Lithuania
Towns in Kaunas County